Arthur Dillon may refer to:

Arthur Dillon (1670–1733), an Irish-born soldier in the French army
Arthur Dillon (1750–1794), French-Irish soldier, grandson of Arthur Dillon (1670–1733)
Arthur Dillon (1834–1922), French cavalry officer and Boulangiste, grandson of Arthur Dillon (1750–1794)
Arthur Richard Dillon (1721–1806), French archbishop

See also
 Dillon (surname)